The Rains is the first recording by supergroup Some Girls.

Track listing

Some Girls (California band) albums
2002 debut EPs
Deathwish Inc. EPs